The Civic Boulevard (also called 5th Blvd) is a 4 to 6-lane highway located in Taipei, Taiwan. It was completed in 1997 as part of a multi-modal reconstruction project to improve transportation networks in congested central Taipei. The highway begins at the MacArthur Bridges in the east (connecting the Neihu district, and Keelung Road (in the Xinyi and Songshan districts), heads west to an interchange with the Zhongxiao Bridge and the HuanHe Expressway, providing direct access to Taipei Main Station, which is just south of the Civic Blvd. Expressway in the Zhongzheng district. Since Civic Blvd. is elevated, there is also a surface-level frontage road system below the highway, connecting intersecting arterials with highway ramps. As part of the larger project, the elevated Civic Blvd. Expressway was constructed to provide a new, east–west highway through Taipei, moving the Taipei railway railroad tracks underground to reduce congestion at surface railroad crossings, and providing new underground parking options. Other additions to this project constructed new underground shopping malls in the vicinity of Taipei Main Station and provisions for utilities. In the future, tracks for the Taiwan High Speed Rail system will be added under existing tracks for the THSR's extension to Nangang in 2012.

Major interchanges 
 Zhongxiao Bridge/Huanhe Expressway (1st Ave.) - half-interchange with surface arterial and direct-flyover ramps to Zhongxiao Bridge and Huanhe Expressway
 Chongqing N. Road (4th Ave.) - half-interchange 
 Xinsheng Expressway (8th Ave.)/Jinshan N. Road, Xinsheng S. Road/Songjiang Road (9th Ave.)Bade Road - full interchange
 Guangfu S. Road (13th Ave.), 5th Blvd (surface arterial) - half-interchange
 Keelung Road - ramps to surface arterial (to Xinyi and Songshan) & direct-flyover ramps to MacAuthur bridges (to Neihu)

See also
 List of roads in Taiwan

1997 establishments in Taiwan
Viaducts in Taiwan
Roads in Taipei
Highways in Taiwan